Melanolophia sadrinaria is a moth of the family Geometridae first described by Frederick H. Rindge in 1964. It is found in Costa Rica.

References

Moths described in 1964
Melanolophiini